Cryptonatica is a genus of predatory sea snails, marine gastropod mollusks in the family Naticidae, the moon snails.

Species
Species within the genus Cryptonatica include:
 Cryptonatica adamsiana (Dunker, 1860)
 Cryptonatica affinis (Gmelin, 1791)
 Cryptonatica aleutica (Dall, 1919)
 Cryptonatica andoi (Nomura, 1935)
 Cryptonatica bathybii (Friele, 1879)
 Cryptonatica figurata (G. B. Sowerby III, 1914)
 Cryptonatica hirasei (Pilsbry, 1905)
 Cryptonatica huanghaiensis Zhang, 2008
 Cryptonatica janthostoma (Deshayes, 1839)
 Cryptonatica operculata (Jeffreys, 1885)
 Cryptonatica purpurfunda S.-P. Zhang & P. Wei, 2010
 Cryptonatica ranzii (Kuroda, 1961)
 Cryptonatica russa (Gould, 1859)
 Cryptonatica sphaera S.-P. Zhang & P. Wei, 2010
 Cryptonatica striatica S.-P. Zhang & P. Wei, 2010
 Cryptonatica wakkanaiensis Habe & Ito, 1976
 Cryptonatica zenryumaruae Habe & Ito, 1976
Species brought into synonymy
 Cryptonatica bathybia Golikov & Sirenko, 1988: synonym of Cryptonatica bathybii (Friele, 1879)
 Cryptonatica clausa (Broderip & G. B. Sowerby I, 1829): synonym of Cryptonatica affinis (Gmelin, 1791)
 Cryptonatica janthostomoides (Kuroda & Habe, 1949): synonym of Cryptonatica andoi (Nomura, 1935)
 Cryptonatica salimba Dall, 1919: synonym of Cryptonatica affinis (Gmelin, 1791) 
 Cryptonatica septentrionalis Møller, 1842: synonym of Cryptonatica affinis (Gmelin, 1791)

References

 Deshayes, G. P., 1839. Nouvelles espèces de mollusques, provenant des côtes de la Californie, du Mexique, du Kamtschatka et de la Nouvelle-Zélande. Revue Zoologique par la Société Cuvierienne 2: 356-361
 Golikov, A. N.; Kussakin, O. G. (1974). Additions to the fauna of shell bearing Gastropods from the intertidal zone of the Kurile Islands. Sbornik Rabot Instituta Biologii Morya 
 Robba E., Pedriali L. & Quaggiotto E. (2016). Eocene, Oligocene and Miocene naticid gastropods of northern Italy. Rivista Italiana di Paleontologia e Stratigrafia. 122(2): 109-234.

External links
 Dall W.H. (1892). Contributions to the Tertiary fauna of Florida with especial reference to the Miocene silex-beds of Tampa and the Pliocene beds of the Caloosahatchie River. 2. Streptodont and other gastropods, concluded. Transactions of the Wagner Free Institute of Science, Philadelphia. 3(2): 201-473

Naticidae